Oxyrhabdium is a genus of snakes of the family Cyclocoridae.

Species
 Oxyrhabdium leporinum (Günther, 1858)
 Oxyrhabdium modestum (Duméril, 1853)

References

Oxyrhabdium
Snake genera